University Alliance may refer to:

University Alliance - an association of British universities 
University Alliance (US) - a group of US universities offering online education
University Alliance of the Silk Road - a group of institutions in China